146 may refer to:

146 (number), a natural number
AD 146, a year in the 2nd century AD
146 BC, a year in the 2nd century BC
146 (Antrim Artillery) Corps Engineer Regiment, Royal Engineers

See also
 List of highways numbered 146